Paradise Lost is an American television series created by Rodes Fishburne.  It premiered on April 13, 2020, on Spectrum Originals.  On July 30, 2020, lead cast member Josh Hartnett confirmed that the show will not be renewed for a second season.

Premise
Yates Forsythe returns to his hometown in Mississippi with his psychiatrist wife Frances and their two children, only to uncover secrets that change the lives of everyone involved.

Cast
 Josh Hartnett as Yates Forsythe
 Bridget Regan as Frances Forsythe
 Nick Nolte as Judge Forsythe
 Barbara Hershey as Byrd Forsythe
 Gail Bean as Gynnifer Green
 Danielle Deadwyler as Nicque Green
 Autry Haydon-Wilson as Janus Forsythe
 Elaine Hendrix as Devoe Shifflet
 John Marshall Jones as Uncle Ronny
 Shane McRae as Dickie Barrett
 Silas Weir Mitchell as Boyd Suttree
 Brett Rice as Uncle BB

Episodes

Production

Casting
On June 11, 2019, it was announced that Josh Hartnett and Bridget Regan were to portray the lead characters of the show.  In addition to Hartnett and Regan, actors Barbara Hershey, Nick Nolte, Gail Bean, Danielle Deadwyler and Shane McRae were cast in supporting roles.  On December 16, 2019, it was announced that Matt Battaglia will appear in the series.

Filming
Principal photography occurred in Baton Rouge.

Reception
Josh Bell of CBR gave the series a negative review and wrote, "The details of the mysteries in Spectrum's Paradise Lost are mostly unclear and the dialogue is full of portentous-sounding nonsense."

References

External links
 

2020s American drama television series
2020 American television series debuts
English-language television shows
Spectrum Originals original programming
Television series by Anonymous Content
Television series by Paramount Television
Television shows filmed in Louisiana
Television shows set in Mississippi